Brian Henderson may refer to:
Brian Henderson (academic) (1936–2017), English solid-state spectroscopic physicist 
Brian Henderson (English footballer) (1930–2001), English footballer for Darlington
Brian Henderson (television presenter) (1931–2021), New Zealand-born Australian television personality
Brian Henderson (Australian footballer) (1943–2017), Australian footballer for the Carlton Football Club
Brian Henderson (poet) (born 1948), Canadian writer and poet 
Brian Henderson (ice hockey) (born 1986), French ice hockey player 
Brian Henderson (racing driver) (born 1997), American stock car racing driver

See also
Bryan Henderson (born 1977), American football defensive lineman
Brian Henderson-Sellers (born 1950), Australian computer scientist
Henderson (surname)